A Gasworks is an industrial plant for the production of flammable gas.

 Gasworks  or  Gas works  may also refer to:

 Gas Works Park, public park in Seattle, Washington
 Gasworks Bridge, an iron bridge across the River Thames at Oxford in England
 Gasworks Gallery, art galleries in the United Kingdom
 Gasworks Newstead, commercial development in Newstead, Brisbane, Australia